AL-34662 is an indazole derivative drug that is being developed for the treatment of glaucoma. It acts as a selective 5-HT2A receptor agonist, the same target as that of psychedelic drugs like psilocin, but unlike these drugs, AL-34662 was designed specifically as a peripherally selective drug, which does not cross the blood–brain barrier. This means that AL-34662 can exploit a useful side effect of the hallucinogenic 5-HT2A agonists, namely reduction in intra-ocular pressure and hence relief from the symptoms of glaucoma, but without causing the hallucinogenic effects that make centrally active 5-HT2A agonists unsuitable for clinical use. In animal studies, AL-34662 has been shown to be potent and effective in the treatment of symptoms of glaucoma, with minimal side effects.

Peripherally acting 5-HT2A agonists have been a rich field of research in recent years, with potential glaucoma treatments being the main proposed application for 5-HT2A agonists at present, as centrally acting agonists for this receptor tend to be hallucinogenic and thus their medical usefulness is currently limited to the treatment of psychiatric disorders. While many novel, potent and selective 5-HT2A agonists have been developed for this application,

 retaining peripheral selectivity can be a problem, and several of the more lipophilic compounds closely related to AL-34662 such as those shown below, did cross the blood–brain barrier and produced hallucinogen-appropriate responding in animals.

See also 
 AAZ-A-154
 AL-38022A
 Ro60-0175
 SCHEMBL5334361
 VER-3323
 YM-348

References 

Indazoles
Amines
Peripherally selective drugs
Serotonin receptor agonists
Hydroxyarenes